The 2021 Murcia Open was a professional tennis tournament played on clay courts. It was the 2nd edition of the tournament which was part of the 2021 ATP Challenger Tour. It took place in Murcia, Spain, between 27 September and 3 October 2021.

Singles main-draw entrants

Seeds

 1 Rankings are as of 20 September 2021.

Other entrants
The following players received wildcards into the singles main draw:
  Pablo Llamas Ruiz
  Álvaro López San Martín
  Daniel Rincón

The following players received entry into the singles main draw using protected rankings:
  Joris De Loore
  Jeroen Vanneste

The following players received entry from the qualifying draw:
  Emilio Nava
  Francesco Passaro
  Mats Rosenkranz
  Alex Rybakov

Champions

Singles

 Tallon Griekspoor def.  Roberto Carballés Baena 3–6, 7–5, 6–3.

Doubles

 Raúl Brancaccio /  Flavio Cobolli def.  Alberto Barroso Campos /  Roberto Carballés Baena 6–3, 7–6(7–4).

References

2021 ATP Challenger Tour
2021 in Spanish tennis
September 2021 sports events in Spain
October 2021 sports events in Spain